Tamonash Ghosh (died 24 June 2020) was an Indian politician who was a Member of the West Bengal Legislative Assembly from the Falta Assembly constituency representing the All India Trinamool Congress in 2011 and 2016 West Bengal Legislative Assembly election.

Biography
He was a member of the West Bengal Legislative Assembly for Falta from 2011 till his death in 2020. Ghosh died from COVID-19 at the age of 60.

References

 

 

1960s births
2020 deaths
Trinamool Congress politicians
Deaths from the COVID-19 pandemic in India
West Bengal MLAs 2016–2021
West Bengal MLAs 2011–2016
People from South 24 Parganas district